Amplitude distortion is distortion occurring in a system, subsystem, or device when the output amplitude is not a linear function of the input amplitude under specified conditions.  

Generally, output is a linear function of input only for a fixed portion of the transfer characteristics. In this region, Ic=βIb where Ic is collector current and Ib is base current, following linear relation y=mx.

When output is not in this portion, two forms of amplitude distortion might arise
 Harmonic distortion : The creation of harmonics of the fundamental frequency of a sine wave input to a system.
 Intermodulation distortion : This form of distortion occurs when two sine waves of frequencies X and Y are present at the input, resulting in the creation of several other frequency components, whose frequencies include (X+Y), (X-Y), (2X-Y), (2Y-X), and generally (mX ± nY) for integer m and n. Generally the size of the unwanted output falls rapidly as m and n increase.

Due to the additional outputs, this form of distortion is definitely unwanted in audio, radio and telecommunication amplifiers, and it occurs for more than two waves as well.

In a narrowband system such as a radio communication system, unwanted outputs such as X-Y and 2X+Y will be remote from the wanted band and so be ignored by the system. In contrast, 2X-Y and 2Y-X will be close to the wanted signals. These so-called third order distortion products (third order as m+n = 3) tend to dominante the non-linear distortion of narrowband systems.

Amplitude distortion is measured with the system operating under steady-state conditions with a sinusoidal input signal. When other frequencies are present, the term "amplitude" refers to that of the fundamental only.

See also
Audio quality measurement
Noise measurement
Headroom
Programme levels

References

External links
Arcane Radio Trivia amplitude distortion article w/ examples
RF article with trigonometry

Electrical parameters